

The Marquis  was the eighth head of the Uwajima Domain during the Late Tokugawa shogunate and a politician of the early Meiji era.

Early life
Munenari was born in Edo, the 4th son of the hatamoto Yamaguchi Naokatsu. Munenari, then known as Kamesaburō 亀三郎, was a candidate for adoption by the heirless 7th generation Uwajima lord Date Munetada because Naokatsu's father was the 5th Uwajima lord, Date Muratoki.

Clan leader
Munenari succeeded to headship in 1844. The tairō Ii Naosuke ordered Munenari's retirement in 1858.  He was placed under house arrest.

He returned to prominence in the subsequent years of political maneuvering in Kyoto, as a member of the conciliatory kōbu-gattai (公武合体 union of court and bakufu) party. Late in Bunkyū 3 (1863), as a proponent of kōbu-gattai, he was made a member of the imperial advisory council (sanyō-kaigi 参与会議), together with Matsudaira Katamori and other like-minded lords.

National leader
After the fall of the shogunate in 1868, Munenari took an active role in the new imperial government; Uwajima as a domain was also deeply involved in the military campaign of the Boshin War (1868–1869).

Munenari was a crucial figure in Japan's international relations during the early Meiji period. In 1871, representing the Japanese government, he signed the Sino-Japanese Friendship and Trade Treaty with Li Hongzhang, a viceroy of Qing Dynasty China.

Also in 1871, the han system was abolished in Japan, and he was able to fully cut his political ties to Uwajima. In 1881, Munenari entertained King Kalākaua, of the Kingdom of Hawaii, on the first state visit to Japan of an actual head of state in its recorded history. He was first created a count in the new peerage system, but was later promoted to marquess.

Munenari died at Imado in Tokyo in 1892, at age 75.

Gallery

See also 
 Ansei purge
 Date clan

Ancestry

Notes

References
Date Munenari 伊達宗城. Date Munenari zaikyō nikki. Tokyo: Nihon shiseki kyōkai 日本史籍協会, 1916.
Nihonshi Jiten 日本史辞典. Tokyo: Ōbunsha 旺文社, 2000.
Much of this article has been compiled from corresponding content on the Japanese Wikipedia.

Further reading
Date Munenari 伊達宗城. Date Munenari zaikyō nikki. Tokyo: Nihon shiseki kyōkai 日本史籍協会, 1916.
Hyōdō Ken'ichi 兵頭賢一. Date Munenari Kō-den 伊達宗城公傳. Annotated by Kondō Toshifumi 今藤俊文. Tokyo: Sōsendo shuppan 創泉堂出版, 2005.
Kusunoki Seiichirō 楠精一郎. Retsuden Nihon kindaishi: Date Munenari kara Kishi Nobusuke made 列伝・日本近代史: 伊達宗城から岸信介まで. Tokyo: Asahi Shinbunsha 朝日新聞社, 2000.
Miyoshi Masafumi 三好昌文. Bakumatsu ki Uwajima-han no dōkō: Date Munenari wo chūshin ni: Dai ikkan 幕末期宇和島藩の動向: 伊達宗城を中心に: 第一卷. Uwajima: Miyoshi Masafumi 三好昌文, 2001.
Tokugawa Nariaki, Date Munenari ōfuku shokanshū 徳川斉昭・伊達宗城往復書翰集. Edited by Kawachi Hachirō 河內八郎. Tokyo: Azekura Shobō 校倉書房, 1993.
Totman, Conrad. The Collapse of the Tokugawa Bakufu, 1862-1868. Honolulu: University of Hawai'i Press, 1980.

External links

Date Munenari bio (in Japanese)

Daimyo
Japanese politicians
1818 births
1892 deaths
Kazoku
Meiji Restoration
Date clan
Deified Japanese people
People from Tokyo